Marijampolė County is one of the ten counties in Lithuania. It is in the south of the country in the historical Suvalkija region, and its capital is the town Marijampolė. On 1 July 2010, the county administration was abolished, and since that date, Marijampolė County remains as the territorial and statistical unit.

Municipalities
Municipalities are:

References

External links
Social and demographic characteristics of Marijampolė County
Economy of Marijampolė County
Environment of Marijampolė County

 
Counties of Lithuania